FK Ozren may refer to:
FK Ozren Petrovo, Bosnia and Herzegovina football club
FK Ozren Semizovac, Bosnia and Herzegovina football club
FK Ozren Sokobanja, Serbian football club

See also 
 Ozren (disambiguation)